Varanasi City railway station is one of the railway stations in Varanasi. It serves as terminal station due to heavy rush at Varanasi Junction.

Passenger amenities

At Varanasi City railway station, there are five platforms, planning for 8 platforms are already approved. There is one entrance to the station. Because of heavy rush at Varanasi Junction the Railway Board decided to develop Manduadih railway station and Varanasi City railway station as satellite stations. Now, Varanasi City is the headquarters station of the North Eastern Railway (Varanasi City Division). Earlier Varanasi Junction was the headquarters of the North Eastern Railway but later North Eastern Railway changed the headquarter. As Varanasi Junction falls under the Northern Railway, Lucknow Charbagh Division. The station is well connected with the cities like Ghazipur, Mau, Darbhanga, Chhapra, Mumbai, Lucknow, Gorakhpur, Kanpur, etc.

Express trains originating from Varanasi City

Passenger trains originating from Varanasi City

See also
Varanasi Junction railway station
Banaras railway station
Kashi railway station
Mughalsarai Junction railway station

References

External links

Railway stations in Varanasi
Varanasi railway division